The Elms, also known as the Bess Streeter Aldrich House, was listed on the National Register of Historic Places in 1977.

Built in 1922 in Prairie School style, it was home of author Bess Streeter Aldrich.

It is a two-story frame house with brick veneer.

It is located off one block off Nebraska Highway 1 at 204 East F Street.

References

External links

		

National Register of Historic Places in Cass County, Nebraska
Prairie School architecture
Buildings and structures completed in 1922